The 2016 World Junior B Curling Championships was held from January 3 to 10 at the Kisakallio Sports Institute in Lohja, Finland. The top three men’s and women’s teams at the World Junior B Curling Championships will qualify for the 2016 World Junior Curling Championships.

Men

Round-robin standings

Qualification Game
Saturday, January 9, 9:00

Playoffs

Quarterfinals
Saturday, January 9, 14:00

Semifinals
Sunday, January 10, 9:00

Bronze-medal game
Sunday, January 10, 14:00

Gold-medal game
Sunday, January 10, 14:00

Women

Round-robin standings

Qualification Game
Saturday, January 9, 14:00

Playoffs

Quarterfinals
Saturday, January 9, 19:00

Semifinals
Sunday, January 10, 9:00

Bronze-medal game
Sunday, January 10, 14:00

Gold-medal game
Sunday, January 10, 14:00

References

External links
Official Website

 
2016 in curling
Lohja
2016 in Finnish sport
2016 in youth sport
2016
International curling competitions hosted by Finland